Patras Bus Station also known as KTEL Achaias bus station, is the third largest Bus Station in Greece after Athens Kifissos Bus Station and Thessaloniki Macedonia Bus Station. The bus station opened in 1976 in the city center of Patras in the opposite side of the port. The bus station is close to Patras Railway Station. It is connected with Patras Bus Organisation which serves bus routes in the whole city. KTEL Achaias has a hub in the bus station. Due to its small terminal, other routes such as to Zakynthos, Kefalonia, Corfu, Trikala, Lefkada are served from other stations on Othonos Amalias Avenue. It will open in early 2023.

Destinations

References

Bus stations in Greece
Buildings and structures in Patras
Transport in Patras